St. Anthony Cathedral, also known as the Ethiopian Catholic Cathedral of Emdibir, is a cathedral of the Ethiopian Catholic Church located in Emdibir, Ethiopia. It follows the Alexandrian Rite.

The cathedral is the main church of the Ethiopian Catholic Eparchy of Emdeber (Eparchia Emdeberensis), which was created in 2003 by the bull "Ad universae incrementum" of Pope John Paul II with territory of the Ethiopian Catholic Archaeparchy of Addis Ababa.

It is under the pastoral responsibility of Bishop Musie Ghebreghiorghis.

See also
Cathedral of the Holy Saviour, Adigrat
Holy Trinity Cathedral, Sodo
Roman Catholicism in Ethiopia

References

Eastern Catholic cathedrals in Ethiopia
Southern Nations, Nationalities, and Peoples' Region